Philippe Madrelle (21 April 1937 – 27 August 2019) was a French politician. A member of the Socialist Party, he served as a Deputy from the Gironde between 1968 and 1980, President of the General Council of Gironde between 1976 and 2015, and Senator from 1980 until his death.

Biography

Political involvement

Senator for Gironde (1980—2019) 
Madrelle was elected Senator for Gironde on 28 September 1980. He was re-elected on 24 September 1989, 27 September 1998, 21 September 2008, and 28 September 2014. From 1 October 2017, he became the longest serving active member of the Senate, succeeding Serge Dassault. He indicated that he wished to not represent himself again at the expiration of his senatorial mandate in 2020. He died of cancer on 27 August 2019 in Bordeaux.

Summary of mandates 

 Senator for Gironde (1980—2019)
 Deputy for Gironde's 4th constituency (1968—1980)
 President of the Regional Council of Aquitaine (1981—1985)
 Regional Councillor of Aquitaine (1986—1989)
 President of the General Council of Gironde (1976—1985 and 1988—2015)
 General Councillor of Gironde (1968—2015)
 Mayor of Carbon-Blanc (1976—2001)

References

1937 births
2019 deaths
French Senators of the Fifth Republic
Socialist Party (France) politicians
Senators of Gironde